(), abbreviated OPC, is a pharmaceutical company headquartered in Tokyo, Osaka and Naruto, Japan. The company was established August 10, 1964.

History
OPC's parent company Otsuka Holdings Co. Ltd. joined the Tokyo Stock Exchange through an initial public offering (IPO) on December 15, 2010, at which time Otsuka Holdings was Japan's No.2 drug maker by sales after industry leader Takeda Pharmaceutical Company.  The IPO debuted at $2.4 billion, making it the largest for a pharmaceutical company up to that time.

Otsuka Pharmaceutical Co. LTD Holdings 

In 1955, the company started a football club called "Otsuka Pharmaceutical SC." In 2005 the name changed to Tokushima Vortis. The club is based in Naruto.

In 2008, Otsuka Pharmaceutical Co. acquired 49% of Alma S.A., which is the parent company of CG Roxane.

In March 2017, the company agreed to acquire Neurovance, Inc. for $250 million,  gaining the firm’s Phase III-ready ADHD drug centanafadine (previously EB-1020). Otsuka's subsidiary Otsuka America will pay $100 million upfront for Neurovance, plus up-to $150 million in development and approval milestones. As a result of the transaction, Neurovance will operate as an indirect, wholly owned subsidiary.

In July 2017, they bought Daiya

In July 2018, Otsuka agreed to acquire Visterra for $430 million cash.

Products
 CalorieMate
 Pocari Sweat
 Oronamin C
 Aripiprazole / Abilify

Otsuka Holdings Co. Ltd. Holdings 

In 1986, Otsuka Holdings Co. Ltd. acquired Ridge Vineyards.

In 1990, Otsuka Holdings Co. Ltd. acquired Crystal Geyser Water Company.

In early 2012, Otsuka announced it would focus its "future operations on CNS disorders and oncology".  This decision necessitated a revision in the terms of an agreement with UCB to end collaboration on immunology products while continuing collaboration in the CNS area.

In September 2013, Otsuka Holdings it acquired Astex Pharmaceuticals for close to $900 million.

In December 2014, Otsuka Holdings struck a deal to buy Avanir Pharmaceuticals for $3.54 billion.

In July 2018, Otsuka Holdings acquired renal-focused ReCor Medical, Inc.

References

External links
 Otsuka Pharmaceutical Company, Limited.
(in English) Otsuka Integrated Report 2017 

 
Companies listed on the Tokyo Stock Exchange
Pharmaceutical companies of Japan
Food and drink companies of Japan
Pharmaceutical companies established in 1964
Manufacturing companies based in Tokyo
Japanese brands
2010 initial public offerings
Multinational companies headquartered in Japan